Suryapura  is a village development committee in Parasi District in Lumbini Province of southern Nepal. At the time of the 1991 Nepal census it had a population of 4372 people living in 638 individual households.

References

Populated places in Parasi District